MV Trisha Kerstin 2 is a roll-on/roll-off ferry vessel owned and operated by Aleson Shipping Lines. She is the former MV Geiyo, acquired by Aleson Shipping in July 2003.

References

External links 
 
 MV Trisha Kerstin 2 Specs - Maritime Connector
 MV Trisha Kerstin 2 Specs - Shipsinfo
 Transit: Going to Tawi-tawi

1989 ships
Ships built in Japan
Ferries of the Philippines
Ships of the Philippines